Ruddy is a reddish-rosy crimson colour, closer to red than to rose.

Ruddy may also refer to:

Surname 
Albert S. Ruddy (born 1930), Canadian-born American film producer
Christopher Ruddy (born 1965), American journalist; CEO of NewsMax Media
Craig Ruddy (1968–2022), Australian artist
Denis Ruddy (born 1950), Scottish footballer
Ed Ruddy (fl. 1933–1951), American soccer player
Ella Giles Ruddy (1851–1917), American author, editor
Jack Ruddy (born 1997), Scottish footballer
John Ruddy (born 1986), English football player
John D Ruddy, Irish actor and artist
Joe Ruddy (1878–1962), American Olympic swimmer and water polo player
Lisa Ruddy (born 1967), Canadian actress
Michael A. Ruddy (1900–1987), American politician and businessman
Rachel Ruddy (born 1988), Gaelic football player
Ray Ruddy (1911–1938), American Olympic swimmer
Stephen Ruddy (1901–1964), American Olympic swimmer
Tim Ruddy (born 1972), American football player
Tom Ruddy (1902–1979), English footballer

Given name
Ruddy Buquet (born 1977), French football referee
 Ruddy Lilian Thuram-Ulien (born 1972), French footballer
Ruddy Lugo (born 1980), Dominican-American Major League Baseball pitcher
Ruddy Nelhomme (born 1972), Guadeloupean-French basketball coach
Ruddy Rodríguez (born 1967), former Miss Venezuela World
Ruddy Thomas (1951–2006), Jamaican musician
Ruddy Zang Milama (born 1987), Gabon track and field athlete

Other uses
 Ruddy (horse), winner of the 1951 Monmouth Oaks
Bowdlerisation of or euphemism for bloody, a commonly used expletive attributive or intensifier

See also
Florid (disambiguation)
List of colors (compact)

Anglicised Irish-language surnames
Surnames of Irish origin